Bryce is an unincorporated community in Rusk County, located in the U.S. state of Texas. According to the Handbook of Texas, the community had a population of 15 in 2000. It is located within the Longview, Texas metropolitan area.

History
The area in what is known as Bryce today was first settled in the 1880s and was originally a lumber community known as Eulalie. Henry H. Moreland served as postmaster in 1893 until it closed in 1907. Mail was then sent from Timpson. In 1896, the community had 150 residents, as well as two churches, a physician, and three businesses. The population dropped to 75 in 1910, 40 in the 1930s, then 15 in 2000. Its name was changed to Bryce in 1984.

Geography

Education
Bryce may have had a school in 1896. Today, the community is served by the Henderson Independent School District.

Notes

Unincorporated communities in Cherokee County, Texas
Unincorporated communities in Texas